Miss America 1964, the 37th Miss America pageant, was held at the Boardwalk Hall in Atlantic City, New Jersey on September 7, 1963 and was broadcast on CBS.

Donna Axum became the first Miss Arkansas to win the crown.

Results

Order of announcements

Top 10

Top 5

Awards

Preliminary awards

Other awards

Contestants

External links
 Miss America official website

1964
1963 in the United States
1964 beauty pageants
1963 in New Jersey
September 1963 events in the United States
Events in Atlantic City, New Jersey